Peter H. Egger (born in Steyr in 1969) is an Austrian economist who currently works as Professor of Applied Economics at the ETH Zurich. His research areas are industrial economics, innovation and international competition. In 2011, his contributions to economic research were awarded the Gossen Prize.

Biography

A native of Steyr, Austria, Peter H. Egger earned a master's degree and Ph.D. in economics from the University of Linz in 1996 and 2001. During his studies, he worked as a researcher at the Vienna Institute for Comparative Economic Studies (1996–97) and at the Austrian Institute of Economic Research (1997-2001). In 2001, he also habilitated at the University of Innsbruck, where he then began working as assistant professor (2001–02) and later as associate professor (2002–04). After a brief visiting appointment at the University of Notre Dame (2003–04), he became Professor of Economics at the Ludwig Maximilian University of Munich (2004–09), where he intermittedly led the ifo Institute's Department of Environmental, Regional and Transport Economics (2004–08) and Department of Foreign Direct Investment and International Trade (2008–09). Since 2009, Egger has been Professor of Applied Economics at the Konjunkturforschungsstelle (KOF) - the Swiss Institute for Business Cycle Research - of the ETH Zurich, where he leads the Division "Structural Change and Innovation". In addition to his academic positions, Egger maintains affiliations with the Centre for Economic Policy Research (CEPR), CESifo, and the Austrian Institute of Economic Research (WIFO).

Research
Peter Egger's research focuses on applied and theoretical panel econometrics, international and regional economics, industrial organization and multinational firms. According to IDEAS/RePEc, Peter Egger belongs to the top 1% of economists ranked by research output.

Selected publications

 Egger, P. (2000). A note on the proper econometric specification of the gravity equation. Economics Letters, 66(1), pp. 25–31.
 Egger, P. (2002). An econometric view on the estimation of gravity models and the calculation of trade potentials. World Economy, 25(2), pp. 297–312.
 Baltagi, B.H., Egger, P., Pfaffermayr, M. (2007). Estimating models of complex FDI: Are there third-country effects? Journal of Econometrics, 140(1), pp. 260–281.
 Egger, P., Pfaffermayr, M. (2003). The proper panel econometric specification of the gravity equation: A three-way model with bilateral interaction effects. Empirical Economics, 28(3), pp. 571–580.
 Egger, P., Winner, H. (2005). Evidence on corruption as an incentive for foreign direct investment. European Journal of Political Economy, 21(4), pp. 932–952.
 Baltagi, B.H., Egger, P., Pfaffermayr, M. (2003). A generalized design for bilateral flow models. Economics Letters, 80(3), pp. 391–397.
 Bergstrand, J.H., Egger, P. (2007). A knowledge-and-physical-capital model of international trade flows, foreign direct investment, and multinational enterprises. Journal of International Economics, 73(2), pp. 278–308.
 Becker, S.O., Egger, P.H., Von Ehrlich, M. (2010). Going NUTS: The effect of EU Structural Funds on regional performance. Journal of Public Economics, 94(9-10), pp. 578–590.
 Egger, P., Pfaffermayr, M. (2004). The impact of bilateral investment treaties on foreign direct investment. Journal of Comparative Economics, 32(4), pp. 788–804.
 Becker, S.O., Egger, P.H. (2013). Endogenous product versus process innovation and a firm's propensity to export. Empirical Economics, 44(1), pp. 329–354.
 Egger, P., Pfaffermayr, M. (2004). Distance, trade and FDI: A Hausman-Taylor SUR approach.
 Egger, P., Egger, H. (2006). International outsourcing and the productivity of low-skilled labor in the EU. Economic Inquiry, 44(1), pp. 98–108.
 Egger, P., Larch, M. (2008). Interdependent preferential trade agreement memberships: An empirical analysis. Journal of International Economics, 76(2), pp. 384–399.
 Egger, P. et al. (2011). The trade effects of endogenous preferential trade agreements. American Economic Journal: Economic Policy, 3(3), pp. 113–143.
 Egger, H., Egger, P. (2003). Outsourcing and skill-specific employment in a small economy: Austria after the fall of the Iron Curtain. Oxford Economic Papers, 55(4), pp. 625–643.
 Baltagi, B.H., Egger, P., Pfaffermayr, M. (2008). Estimating regional trade agreement effects on FDI in an interdependent world. Journal of Econometrics, 145(1-2), pp. 194–208.
 Egger, P., Winner, H. (2006). How corruption influences foreign direct investment: A panel data study. Economic Development and Cultural Change, 54(2), pp. 459–486.
 Breuss, F., Egger, P. (1999). How reliable are estimations of East-West trade potentials based on cross-section gravity analyses? Empirica, 26(2), pp. 81–94.
 Egger, H., Egger, P., Greenaway, D. (2008). The trade structure effects of endogenous regional trade agreements. Journal of International Economics, 74(2), pp. 278–298.
 Becker, S.O., Egger, P.H., Von Ehrlich, M. (2012). Too much of a good thing? On the growth effects of the EU's regional policy. European Economic Review, 56(4), pp. 648–668.

References

External links

 Profile of Peter Egger on the website of the ETH Zurich
 Google Scholar profile of Peter H. Egger

1969 births
People from Steyr
Austrian economists
Academic staff of ETH Zurich
University of Innsbruck alumni
International economists
Trade economists
Regional economists
Living people